Rock Creek is an unincorporated community in Gilliam County, Oregon, United States.

A post office at Rock Creek was established along Rock Creek on June 3, 1872. Alexander Smith was the first postmaster, and James R. Alfrey was the second postmaster. The Rock Creek office closed on March 11, 1874, and an office opened on October 27 of that year in nearby Olex. This second office used Smith's first name, shortened to Alex, but misspelled as Olex.

References

Unincorporated communities in Gilliam County, Oregon
Unincorporated communities in Oregon